Henry William Newlands (March 19, 1862 – August 9, 1954) was a Canadian politician and lawyer, and he served as Saskatchewan's fourth Lieutenant Governor.

Born in March 1862 in Dartmouth, Nova Scotia, Newlands was called to the Nova Scotia Bar in 1883, after which he would go on to have an important role in the domain of law. That same year, he moved to Western Canada, residing briefly in Winnipeg.

In 1885, Newlands moved to Prince Albert, Saskatchewan where he practiced law. He also served as inspector of land titles offices in the Northwest Territories as well as law adviser to the Yukon Executive Council. In 1902, Newlands served as Acting Commissioner for several months when Commissioner James Hamilton Ross was elected MP for Yukon in the House of Commons of Canada.

On February 5, 1904, he was named a Justice of the Supreme Court of the Northwest Territories, and continued to hold on to the job following the creation of the province of Saskatchewan in 1905.

On March 2, 1918, Newlands was named a Judge of the Saskatchewan Court of Appeal. Three years later, Newlands was appointed Lieutenant-Governor of Saskatchewan and would remain in office for a decade.

Newlands died in 1954.

References

External links
 Painting of Newlands, 1924
 List of Canadian government officials, rulers.org (source for death date)

1862 births
1954 deaths
Commissioners of Yukon
Lieutenant Governors of Saskatchewan
Judges in Saskatchewan
Members of the Yukon Territorial Council